Richmond Xavier Amoakoh (born 19 June 1987) is a Ghanaian comedy actor, writer and director. He is popularly known as Lawyer Nti, the name of a fictional character he plays in the hit TV series Kejetia vs Makola.

Education 
Amoakoh was born on 19 June 1987 in Mampong, Ashanti Region. He is a product of the University of Ghana's School of Performing Arts.

Career 
He began his acting career in 2007 starring in stage plays including Nyansapo's Gallery of Comedy. Starring in the hit TV series Kejetia vs Makola as Layer Nti led to his breakthrough in the Ghanaian movie industry.

Awards 

 Person of the Year - 2017 Nogokpo Awards
Lead Actor in a Comedy Series  - 2018 Ghana Movie Awards
Discovery of the Year - 2018 Ghana Movie Awards

References

Living people
1987 births
Ghanaian comedians
University of Ghana alumni
Ghanaian actors